Ohio's 31st senatorial district has been based in central Ohio since 1982 and currently consists of the counties of Coshocton, Licking, Perry and Tuscarawas along with portions of Holmes county. It encompasses Ohio House districts 71, 72 and 98.  It has a Cook PVI of R+6.  Its current Ohio Senator is Republican Al Landis.  He resides in Dover, a city located in Tuscarawas County.

List of senators

References

External links
Ohio's 31st district senator at the 130th Ohio General Assembly official website

Ohio State Senate districts